The Municipality of Idrija is a municipality in the Gorizia region of western Slovenia. The seat of the municipality is the town of Idrija. The municipality is located in the traditional region of the Slovenian Littoral and is in the Gorizia Statistical Region.

Settlements
In addition to the municipal seat of Idrija, the municipality also includes the following settlements:

 Čekovnik
 Črni Vrh
 Dole
 Godovič
 Gore
 Gorenja Kanomlja
 Gorenji Vrsnik
 Govejk
 Idrijska Bela
 Idrijske Krnice
 Idrijski Log
 Idršek
 Javornik
 Jelični Vrh
 Kanji Dol
 Korita
 Ledine
 Ledinske Krnice
 Ledinsko Razpotje
 Lome
 Masore
 Mrzli Log
 Mrzli Vrh
 Pečnik
 Potok
 Predgriže
 Razpotje
 Rejcov Grič
 Spodnja Idrija
 Spodnja Kanomlja
 Spodnji Vrsnik
 Srednja Kanomlja
 Strmec
 Vojsko
 Zadlog
 Zavratec
 Žirovnica

History
For the history of the town of Idrija itself, see Idrija.

Near the town of Idrija there was an archaeological find of an approximately 43,100-year-old juvenile cave bear femur at Divje Babe, which may be a prehistoric flute.

Under Italian rule (1918–1943, nominally lasted to 1947), the area that is now the Municipality of Idrija was a comune of the Province of Gorizia (as Idria), except during the period between 1924 and 1927, when the Province of Gorizia was abolished and annexed to the Province of Udine.

References

External links 

 Municipality of Idrija on Geopedia
 Idrija, official page of the municipality 

 
Idrija